Vetro means glass in Italian, and may refer to:

People
 Dominic Vetro (born 1958), Canadian football player
 Harry Vetro (born 1995), Canadian drummer

Other
 Vetro Energy

See also